Pleurogrammus is a genus of ray-finned fishes belonging to the family Hexagrammidae, the greenlings, known as atka mackerels. These fishes are found in the northwestern Pacific Ocean.

Taxonomy
Pleurogrammus was first proposed as a genus in 1861 by the American biologist Theodore Gill with Labrax monopterygius, which had been described in 1810 by Peter Simon Pallas, as its type species. The genus was placed in the monogeneric subfamily Pleurogramminae within the family Hexagrammidae by E. P. Rutenberg in 1954.

Etymology
Pleurogrammus is a compound of pleuro, which means "side", and grammus, meaning "line", a reference to the five lateral line canals on each flank.

Species
The currently recognized species in this genus are:

Characteristics
Pleurogrammus species have no incision in the dorsal fin, or if precent the incision is not deep. The caudal fin is forked and there are 5 lateral lines on each flankl. The upper surface of the skull is strongly ridged. There are between 21–24 spines and 24 and30 soft rays in the dorsal fin while the anal fin typically has no spine and has between 23 and 32 soft rays. The head is partially covered in scales.

Distribution and habitat
Pleurogrammus are found in the northern Pacific Ocean around Japan and in the Sea of Okhotsk east to Alaska. These are mainly pelagic fishes.

Fisheries
Pleurogrammus are fished for and P. monopterygius is the target of a commercial fishery in Alaska which mainly uses bottom trawls.

References

 
Hexagrammidae
Taxa named by Theodore Gill